Michelle Gurevich is a Canadian singer-songwriter, also known by her former stage name Chinawoman. Her music is influenced by her Russian heritage, and has been described as slowcore rock and "lo-fi pop". Her largest fanbase is in Eastern Europe.

Life
Gurevich was born in Toronto, Ontario, to Russian-Jewish immigrants and was raised with Russian as her first language. Her father was an engineer in Soviet Leningrad and her mother a Kirov ballerina (the subject of Gurevich's "Russian Ballerina"). Gurevich originally wanted to become a filmmaker and worked ten years in the industry before turning to music. "I eventually tried to write a song and found it was not only cheaper but much easier to get a good result."

Gurevich began her career recording in her bedroom. The stage name "Chinawoman" was chosen as a spur-of-the-moment joke when Garageband prompted her for a band name. After receiving criticism for being a non-Chinese woman inappropriately using the word Chinawoman, Gurevich distanced herself from her stage name and began to perform under her own name.

Gurevich has cited Alla Pugacheva, Adriano Celentano, Charles Aznavour, Yoko Ono, Francis Lai, Nino Rota, Xavier Dolan, Todor Kobakov, Jennifer Castle, and filmmaker Federico Fellini as influences on her music. Gurevich possesses a contralto range.

In 2011, Gurevich was invited to tour Europe as an opening act for Patrick Wolf.

In 2012, "Lovers are Strangers" was the theme song for the Latvian film Kolka Cool.

In 2013, "Russian Ballerina" was featured on the commercial for the Nokia Lumia 1020.

In 2014, Gurevich's song "Party Girl" and "I'll Be Your Woman" inspired the 2014 French film Party Girl.

In 2020, Gurevich moved to Copenhagen, Denmark, with her Danish wife and their 2-year-old daughter.

In 2022, "Feel More" was the theme song for the American documentary miniseries Keep Sweet: Pray and Obey.

Discography

Singles 
2008: "Russian Ballerina"
2012: "Pure at Heart"
2013: "Kiss in Taksim Square"
2021: "Losing Touch"
2022: "Goodbye My Dictator"

Studio albums

References

Living people
Canadian people of Russian-Jewish descent
Musicians from Toronto
Year of birth missing (living people)
Canadian contraltos
21st-century Canadian women singers
Canadian expatriates in Denmark
Canadian LGBT singers
21st-century Canadian LGBT people